Mississippi Highway 315 (MS 315) is an  state highway located in northern Mississippi. The highway consists of two segments, one from MS 9W near Paris in Lafayette County to U.S. Route 278 (US 278) and MS 6 in Panola County, and another from US 278/MS 6 in Panola County to US 49/US 61 near Rich in Coahoma County. Along the way, the highway passes over Sardis Dam east of the town of Sardis. Though the two segments of MS 315 are signed north and south, they generally run in an east to westerly direction.

In addition, a signed scenic route, Mississippi Highway 315 Scenic, runs from Batesville to Sardis by way of Sardis Dam.

Route description

MS 315 begins at MS 9W and County Route 428 (CR 428) near the community of Paris in Lafayette County. The highway heads west (signed north) through a mix of woods and farmlands. It enters Yalobusha where it parallels the banks of Otoucalofa Creek. As the road approaches the city of Water Valley, the name of the road becomes Blackmur Drive as it heads through a residential neighborhood descending in elevation. In the downtown area, MS 315 turns onto Main Street to head south out of center of the city. It reaches MS 32 forming a brief concurrency to the west. MS 315 then reaches MS 7, a divided highway just outside the city limits. MS 315 heads north along MS 7, then curving to the northeast, briefly entering the city limits again, before MS 315 breaks off the concurrency from MS 7 to head northwest out of Yalobusha County. First, it reenters Lafayette County where it crosses the Yocona River and Enid Lake on a through truss bridge, then has an intersection with MS 328. Afterwards, MS 315 heads northwest and then north through woodlands in Panola County. MS 315 reaches a diamond interchange with US 278/MS 6 in a rural section of the county. The state highway officially continues past the interchange to end about  past the interchange at John Branch Road and Marshall Road.

At this point, the state highway is not signed nor is it maintained by the state. The road heads north through a mostly wooded area until it reaches the Sardis Dam within John W. Kyle State Park. The two highways form a concurrency to head down the downslope of the dam. At the bottom of the hill, MS 315 reaches an intersection with MS 35's northern terminus. MS 315 Scenic heads south along MS 35 whereas MS 315 continues northwest along the toe of the dam. After passing the dam, MS 315 reaches a second intersection with MS 315 Scenic. The two roads wind their way northwest through a wooded area before reaching the town limits of Sardis. In the eastern reaches of the town, MS 315 interchanges Interstate 55 (I-55) at its exit 252. At this interchange, MS 315 Scenic ends. Continuing west through town on Lee Street, it passes through the downtown area and then has an intersection with US 51.

As the road heads west through wooded areas, MS 315 exits the North Central Hills region of the state by descending Loess bluffs into the flatter farmland landscapes of the Mississippi Delta region. At an intersection with MS 3 within Quitman County, MS 315 forms the northern border of the town of Sledge. The highway crosses Tallahatchie River before curving to the south at MS 716 (Six Mile Lake Road). The road passes through the unincorporated community of Birdie before entering Coahoma County and curving to the northwest. After passing to the north of the community of Rich, MS 315 ends at an intersection with US 49/US 61.

The entire route of MS 315, excluding the concurrency with MS 7 (which is divided four-lane highway), as well as a short undivided four-lane section between US 51 and I-55 in Sardis, is a rural two-lane.

Major intersections

Scenic route

Mississippi Highway 315 Scenic (MS 315 Scenic) is a  scenic route of MS 315 in Panola County, Mississippi. It connects the towns of Batesville and Sardis with John W. Kyle State Park, as well as connecting MS 315 with Sardis Dam.

MS 315 Scenic begins at an interchange between MS 35 and I-55 (the latter's exit 246) in the northern part of the city of Batesville. It heads west, concurrent (overlapped) with MS 35, where the highway leaves the Batesville city limits and passes by the Panola County Airport and crosses Hotopha Creek. MS 35/MS 315 Scenic heads northeast through farmland for several up a narrow valley to enter John W. Kyle State Park, where they travel along the southern shore of Lower Lake and pass by several businesses to come to an intersection with MS 315, where MS 35 ends and MS 315 Scenic follows MS 315 south to gain elevation as they climb towards the top of Sardis Dam. MS 315 Scenic now breaks off along its own path at another intersection and passes northwestward along the very top of Sardis Dam for a little over two miles, passing by the Arty R. Tapp Overlook, Beach Point Public Use Area, and the John W. Kyle State Park Lodge. MS 315 Scenic makes a sharp left turn at Spillway Road, which leads to the Mallard Pointe Golf Course and the Sardis Lake Field Office (as well as other portions of the state park), and winds its way down the side of the dam, parallel to its spillway, for about a mile to a wooded portion of the valley, where MS 315 Scenic comes to another intersection with MS 315. They become concurrent and wind their way west through hilly woodlands to leave the state park and enter the town of Sardis, where they come to another interchange with I-55 (exit 252), where MS 315 Scenic ends and mainline MS 315 continues west (signed north) into downtown.

The entire length of Mississippi Highway 315 Scenic is a two-lane highway.

References

External links

315
Transportation in Coahoma County, Mississippi
Transportation in Quitman County, Mississippi
Transportation in Panola County, Mississippi
Transportation in Yalobusha County, Mississippi
Transportation in Lafayette County, Mississippi